Silvio Vigliaturo (born in Acri, Cosenza, in 1949) is an Italian artist. When still a child he moved to Chieri (Turin), where presently he lives and works. He is a glassfusion maestro and his technique is appreciated internationally and considered unique in his genre by the most important Italian and foreign critics.

Artistic traits 
Vigliaturo’s artistic journey is one of constant evolution. The never-ending research on colours and forms is symptomatic of a perpetual struggle in favour of the purity of colours and matter’s expressive richness. A journey both gradual and tenacious, that led the artist to confront himself with a great variety of themes with different styles and instruments. Glass, steel, terra cotta and painting  – which he never abandoned – are treated like matter, but represent as well an ideological choice, an important connotation of both his human and artistic growth. His glass works, which the artist creates in his bottega in Chieri, represent the conflict between the modernity of the image, the sign, the idea and the antiquity of the medium. Labeled as Homo Faber, his works are first thought, then interpreted and lived through a constant symbiotic relationship between mind and industriosity, consciousness and craftsmanship, creativity and visual poignancy. 
In 2006, while the city of Turin chose him as the only artistic testimonial for the Winter Olympics, in Acri was inaugurated the MACA – Civic Museum of Contemporary Art Silvio Vigliaturo. 
In 2008 the artist was named testimonial in the world of the UNICAL, University of Calabria.

List of permanent public collections that exhibit the artist’s work
Glass Museum Alterhof Herding, Ernsting, Germany;
Biblioteca Nacional, Madrid, Spain;
Pinacoteca Civica Palazzo dei Musei, Varallo Sesia, Italy;
Regione Piemonte, Palazzo Lascaris, Turin, Italy;
Museo dell’Automobile, Turin, Italy;
Museo Arte Vetraia, Altare, Italy;
Fundacion Centro Nacional del Vidrio, La Granjia, Segovia, Spain;
Hsinchu Municipal Glass Museum, Hsinchu, Taiwan;
Museo ebraico dei Lumi, Casale Monferrato, Italy;
Provincia di Torino, Palazzo Cisterna, Turin, Italy;
MACA-Museo civico d’Arte Contemporanea Silvio Vigliaturo, Acri, Italy;
University of Calabria, Arcavacata di Rende (Cs), Italy;
Museum of erotic art, Las Vegas, Nevada, USA.

Image gallery

Notes

Bibliography
Artisti e opere. Valle d'Aosta, Piemonte, Liguria, cfr. p. 101, Milan, Giorgio Mondari, 1998. 
SOFA2004, cfr. p. 53, New York City, Expressions of culture-NY, 2004. 
Catalogo degli scultori italiani, cfr. pp. 278–279 e 341, Turin, Giorgio Mondadori, 2006. 
Vittorio Sgarbi, I giudizi di Sgarbi. 99 artisti dai cataloghi d'arte moderna e dintorni cfr. pp. 200–201 e 233, Turin, Giorgio Mondadori, 2005.

Monographs on the artist
Vibrazioni in vetro, Venice, Marsilio Editori, 1998. 
Glass and I, Venice, Marsilio Editori, 2000. 
L'anima del vetro, Venice, Marsilio Editori, 2002. 
Allusioni e trasparenze: Silvio Vigliaturo, Turin, Giorgio Mondadori, 2004. IT\ICCU\TO0\1665570
Silvio Vigliaturo. Works, Opere, Scarmagno (Torino), Priuli & Verlucca, 2006.

External links
MACA-Civic Museum of Contemporary Art Silvio Vigliaturo
Silvio Vigliaturo at London Arts Group
Silvio Vigliaturo at Triton Galleries

20th-century Italian painters
Italian male painters
21st-century Italian painters
20th-century Italian sculptors
20th-century Italian male artists
Italian male sculptors
Italian contemporary artists
21st-century Italian sculptors
Italian stained glass artists and manufacturers
Living people
1949 births
Artists from Turin
21st-century Italian male artists